Dr. Veeramachaneni Vimala Devi (15 July 1928 – 1967) was an Indian parliamentarian. She was elected to the 3rd Lok Sabha from Eluru constituency as a member of Communist Party of India in 1962.

References

1928 births
1967 deaths
India MPs 1962–1967
Communist Party of India politicians from Andhra Pradesh
Scottish Church College alumni
Lok Sabha members from Andhra Pradesh
People from Krishna district
Women in Andhra Pradesh politics
Telugu politicians
20th-century Indian women politicians
20th-century Indian politicians
Women members of the Lok Sabha